Frank Van Straten  (born 14 May 1936) is an Australian performing arts historian, author and former director of the Performing Arts Museum.

Van Straten was the first archivist of the Performing Arts Museum (now Australian Performing Arts Collection), at the Arts Centre Melbourne, and its director from 1984 until 1993.

Between 1986 and 2001, he researched and presented ABC Local Radio's Nostalgia segment, broadcast on Melbourne's 774 and the ABC Victorian Regional Network.

In 2002, Van Straten acted as the Historical Consultant for Graeme Murphy's 'dance musical' Tivoli, performed by the Sydney Dance Company, which premiered at the State Theatre, Arts Centre, Melbourne.

Van Straten has served on the board of the National Theatre, Melbourne. He has also served on the judging panels of the Green Room Awards and Helpmann Awards. He is a patron of the Cinema and Theatre Historical Society (Victoria), and a founding member and committee member of the Victoria Theatres Trust (now Theatre Heritage Australia).
 
In recognition of his services to the performing arts in Australia Van Straten was awarded the Medal of the Order of Australia (OAM) in 1999.

In 2007, Van Straten was appointed Live Performance Australia's Official Historian.

Van Straten was made a Member of the Order of Australia (AM) in the 2017 Queen's Birthday Honours.

Bibliography
 Discovering puppets (South Melbourne :  Performing Arts Museum, Victorian Arts Centre, 1981)
 Bourke Street on Saturday night : the memories of Charlie Fredricksen "the man outside Hoyts" (Melbourne : Performing Arts Museum, Victorian Arts Centre, 1983)
 National treasure : the story of Gertrude Johnson and the National Theatre (South Melbourne : Victoria Press, 1994)
 The Regent Theatre : Melbourne's palace of dreams (Melbourne : E.L.M. Publishing, 1996)
 Tivoli (South Melbourne : Lothian, 2003)
 Huge deal : the fortunes and follies of Hugh D. McIntosh (South Melbourne : Lothian Books, 2004)
 Florence Young and the golden years of Australian musical theatre (Mornington, Vic. : Beleura, 2009)
 Her Majesty's Pleasure : A Centenary Celebration for Adelaide's Theatre of the Stars (Adelaide : Wakefield Press, 2013)

References

External links
Interview with Frank van Straten conducted by Bill Stephens, 25 July 1994

Living people
1936 births
Australian historians
20th-century Australian historians
Members of the Order of Australia